The Republican People's Party is a political party in El Salvador. It first contested national elections in 2003, when it won 1.6% of the vote, but failed to win a seat.

References 

Political parties in El Salvador